Kevin Kiley may refer to:

 Kevin C. Kiley (born 1950), retired United States Army major general
 Kevin Kiley (sportscaster), American sportscaster and talk show host
 Kevin Robert Kiley, Jr. (born 1981), American wrestler known as Alex Riley, son of the sportscaster Kevin Kiley
 Kevin Kiley (politician) (born 1985), U.S. representative for California's 3rd congressional district